John Baden Bunting (1900 – 9 January 1951) was an English professional footballer who played as a goalkeeper in the Football League for Brighton & Hove Albion.

Life and career
Bunting was born in 1900 in Bingham, Nottinghamshire, the son of George Bunting, a railway platelayer, and his wife Sarah. He served as a sergeant in the King's Own Yorkshire Light Infantry, and played football for Grantham as an amateur. He had a trial with Nottingham Forest towards the end of the 1920–21 season, before signing professional forms with Grantham in July.

Bunting signed for Leicester City in March 1922. According to the Nottingham Evening Post, "Bunting is undoubtedly one of the ablest custodians in the Central Alliance, and the only surprise is that he has not been transferred months ago." He performed well for Leicester's reserve team, and was selected for the Second Division side to face Rotherham County on 22 April, but was unable to play when it emerged that Nottingham Forest still held his League registration from the previous season's trial. He then spent two seasons with Boston Town of the Midland League, before joining Brighton & Hove Albion of the Third Division South as backup for Walter Cook. He finally made his Football League debut on 20 September 1924 at home to Gillingham, and performed well as Albion climbed to second place in the table, but lost his place after two defeats and failed to regain it.

At the end of the season Bunting signed for Mansfield Town on a free transfer, but was soon forced to retire from football because of the effects of an injury suffered while a Brighton player. He spent time in the Nottingham City Police, and worked on the railways during the Second World War. He remained unmarried, and had lived with his sister at Bingham until his death from tuberculosis at the age of 50.

References

1900 births
1951 deaths
People from Bingham, Nottinghamshire
Footballers from Nottinghamshire
English footballers
Association football goalkeepers
Grantham Town F.C. players
Nottingham Forest F.C. players
Leicester City F.C. players
Boston Town F.C. (1920s) players
Brighton & Hove Albion F.C. players
Mansfield Town F.C. players
Midland Football League players
English Football League players
Southern Football League players
20th-century deaths from tuberculosis
Tuberculosis deaths in England
King's Own Yorkshire Light Infantry soldiers
20th-century British Army personnel